Faletagaloa is a village on the central north coast of Savai'i island in Samoa.

The village is in the traditional sub-district of Safune in the Gagaifomauga electoral division. It has a population of 378.

References

Populated places in Gaga'ifomauga